Livestreaming is streaming media simultaneously recorded and broadcast in real-time over the internet. It is often referred to simply as streaming. Non-live media such as video-on-demand, vlogs, and YouTube videos are technically streamed, but not live-streamed.

Livestream services encompass a wide variety of topics, from social media to video games to professional sports. Platforms such as Facebook Live, Periscope, Kuaishou, Douyu, bilibili and 17 include the streaming of scheduled promotions and celebrity events as well as streaming between users, as in videotelephony. Sites such as Twitch have become popular outlets for watching people play video games, such as in esports, Let's Play-style gaming, or speedrunning. Live coverage of sporting events is a common application.

User interaction via chat rooms forms a major component of livestreaming. Platforms often include the ability to talk to the broadcaster or participate in conversations in chat. Many chat rooms also consist of emotes or emoji which is another way to communicate to the livestreamer.

Social media 
In the field of social media, the term "live media" refers to new media that use streaming media technologies for creating networks of live multimedia shared among people, companies and organizations. Social media marketer Bryan Kramer describes livestreaming as an inexpensive "key marketing and communications tool that helps brands reach their online audience." Users can follow their friends' live video "shares" as well as "shares" related to specific content or items. Live media can be shared through any Internet website or application; thus, when people browse on a specific website, they may find live media streams relevant to the content they look for.

Live media can include coverage of various events such as concerts or live news coverage viewed using a web browser or apps such as Snapchat. James Harden and Trolli promoted an upcoming NBA All-Star Game through Snapchat. Many of LaBeouf, Rönkkö & Turner's performance art were livestreamed, such as a stream of Shia LaBeouf in a theater viewing all his movies.

However, live stream commerce nowadays allows sellers to sell products by a streamer to introduce and illustrate effects (just like sales in physical stores)  to motivate buyers to buy the products and services. Merritt and Zhao mention that Chinese ‘live stream-based retailing’ has supported the economic growth of China and projected that about GBP 98 billion were generated from e-commerce live streaming in China. The McKinsey report also demonstrates that live stream commerce is expanding in China, the sales from live stream commerce were expected to achieve $423 billion by 2022, and the US live streaming industry was also expected to reach $25 billion by 2023. Companies like Amazon Live, Facebook Live Shopping and Gizmeon has introduced Live Commerce in the US market.

Facebook Watch 
Facebook introduced a video streaming service, Facebook Watch to select individuals in August 2016, and to the public in January 2017. Facebook watch is a video-on-demand service that allows users to share content live. It allows people to upload videos that cover a wide array of topics including original comedy, drama, and news programming. Facebook Live allows Facebook users to include their own "reactions" when someone is broadcasting. One of the reasons that Facebook Watch is so successful is because the content is recommended to users based on algorithms that determine what the user would most like to watch.

YouTube Live 
YouTube was purchased by Google in 2006, and the pair subsequently announced their livestreaming app. Like Periscope, users can comment on the broadcast. Unlike Periscope, livestreams on YouTube can be saved and any user can access them through the app. YouTube head of product for consumers Manuel Bronstein stated that livestreaming gives creators the opportunity to "actually create a more intimate connection with their fans."

Lifestreaming 

Lifestreaming, or lifecasting, involves the continuous broadcasting of daily events in one's life. Justin Kan founded Justin.tv as a website for his own continuous lifecasting, and is credited with popularizing the style.

Twitch 
Twitch is a livestreaming video platform owned by Twitch Interactive, a subsidiary of Amazon. Introduced in June 2011 as a spin-off of the general-interest streaming platform, Justin.tv, the site primarily focuses on video game livestreaming, including broadcasts of eSports competitions, in addition to music broadcasts, creative content, and more recently, "in real life" streams. Content on the site can be viewed either live or via video on demand.

Bigo Live 
Bigo Live is a live streaming platform owned by a Singapore-based BIGO Technology, which was founded in 2014 by David Li and Jason Hu. As of 2019, BIGO Technology is owned by JOYY, a Chinese company listed on the NASDAQ. Like YouTube Live, users can watch trendy live streams and comment on the broadcast. Unlike YouTube Live, users on Bigo Live can filter out broadcasters from a certain country on the explore page.

Former

Periscope 
In March 2015, Twitter launched a livestreaming app called Periscope. Normally, users would see a hyperlink attached to their broadcast, directing people to a new tab. Using Periscope, videos appear live on the timeline. If the user has allowed the site to share information, others can see where the user is streaming from. During the broadcast, users can comment, talk to the broadcaster, or ask questions. Kayvon Beykpour, CEO of Periscope, and Dick Costolo and Jack Dorsey, CEOs of Twitter, all shared a common goal—to invent something that would merge both teams into one instead of as partners. It was discontinued in March 2021 due to declining usage, product realignment and high maintenance costs.

Mixer 
Microsoft entered the livestreaming scene when it acquired Beam, the Seattle-based company, in August 2016. About a year after acquiring the company, the service was renamed to Mixer in May 2017.  The platform was the first to bring multiple features to livestreaming such as interactive gameplay, where viewers could influence gameplay, and co-streaming, where viewers could watch multiple viewpoints of teammates in the same game. Like Twitch, viewers on Mixer could pay to subscribe to streamers on a monthly basis. Viewers could also buy "Embers", which was the e-currency used by the site, and could donate that to streamers as well. While Twitch remained the biggest company in the business, Mixer attempted to raise its stock by signing multiple big streamers to Mixer-exclusive deals. These signings included Tyler "Ninja" Blevins in August 2019, Michael "Shroud" Grzesiek in October of 2019, and Cory "King Gothalion" Michael also in October 2019.  Mixer announced it would be shutting down its streaming services on July 22, 2020.  In the announcement, Mixer's parent company, Microsoft, announced a partnership with Facebook gaming, and directed current users to the new platform.

Video games

Livestreaming playing of video games gained popularity during the 2010s. David M. Ewalt referred to Twitch as "the ESPN of video games". The website spawned from and grew to overshadow Justin.tv, and was purchased by Amazon.com at the end of 2014 for US$970 million. As one of the leading livestreaming platform, Twitch now have millions broadcasters and have nearly two hundreds millions viewers.  Other video-game oriented streaming websites include Smashcast.tv, which was formed after the merging of Azubu and Hitbox.tv, and the South Korea-based afreecaTV. In 2015, YouTube launched YouTube Gaming—a video gaming-oriented sub-site and app that is intended to compete with Twitch.

An example of a notable livestreamed event is Games Done Quick, a charity speedrunning marathon hosted on Twitch. Viewers are encouraged to donate for incentives during the stream such as naming characters in a run, having the runners attempt more difficult challenges, or winning prizes. Over $10 million has been raised across sixteen marathons.

Professional streamers can generate livable revenue from viewer subscriptions and donations, as well as platform advertisements and sponsorships from eSports organizations, often earning much more from streaming than from tournament winnings. The audiences of professional gaming tournaments are primarily livestream viewers in addition to live audiences inside venues. The International 2017, a Dota 2 tournament with the largest prize pool in eSport history, was primarily streamed through Twitch, having a peak of over five million concurrent viewers.

Metrics
With livestreaming becoming a financially viable market, particularly for esports, streamers and organizations representing them have looked for metrics to quantify the viewership of streams as to be able to determine pricing for advertisers. Metrics like maximum number of concurrent viewers, or number of subscribers do not readily account for how long a viewer may stay to watch a stream. The most common metric is the "Average Minute Audience" (AMA), which is obtained by taking the total minutes watched by all viewers on the stream during the streamed event and for 24 hours afterwards, divided by the number of minutes that were broadcast. The AMA is comparable to the same metric that the Nielsen ratings for tracking viewership. This also makes it possible to combine standard broadcast and streaming routes for events that are simulcasted on both forms of delivery to estimate total audience size Major events with reported AMA include streamed National Football League games; for example, the average AMA for NFL games in 2018 ranged from 240,000 to 500,000 across streaming services, with the following Super Bowl LIV having an AMA of 2.6 million. In comparison, the esports Overwatch League had an average of 313,000 average minute audience during regular season games in its 2019 season.

Risks in streaming

Many instances of serious crimes such as rape and assault, along with suicides, have been streamed live, leaving little to no time for administrators to remove the offending content. Livestreamed crimes became a trend in the mid-2010s with widely reported incidents such as assaults and suicide streamed through Periscope in 2016 and the kidnapping of a man in Chicago streamed through Facebook Live in 2017. A mass shooting in Jacksonville, Florida, resulting in the deaths of two in addition to the shooter, occurred during a Madden NFL 19 tournament. Part of the Christchurch mosque shootings was streamed on Facebook Live by the perpetrator for 17 minutes.

Additionally, livestreaming to large audiences carries the risk that viewers may commit crimes both remotely and in person. Twitch co-founder Justin Kan had been a frequent target of swatting. An incident occurred in April 2017 at the Phoenix Sky Harbor International Airport when a viewer called in a bomb threat and named streamer Ice Poseidon as the culprit, temporarily shutting down the airport. They may also be victim to stalking as with other celebrities; for example, a teenager showed up uninvited to a streamer's house and requested to live with him after having saved up for a one-way transcontinental flight. A Taiwan-based American streamer fell victim to a doxing and targeted harassment campaign by a Taiwanese streamer, coordinated through a private Facebook group with 17,000 members "whose activities involved tracking [his] whereabouts," death threats and "the distribution of his parents’ U.S. phone number and address". Twitch responded by temporarily suspending the harassed streamer.

Research
Live content streaming has been the topic of numerous papers examining ways to cultivate online communities through live interaction and increase attendance numbers with engaging content. The livestreaming platform Twitch is a common focus among researching trying to transfer its user engagement success to other applications such as improving student participation and learning in massive open online courses (MOOCs).

See also
Internet television
Live streaming world news
National Streaming Day
Online streamer
Webcast

References

External links

New media
Internet broadcasting
Streaming
 
Blogging